= Mercedes Carrasco Herrera =

- Born: Mercedes Eustolia Brigida María de la Trinidad Carrasco Herrera 9 November 1854 Toluca, State of Mexico, Mexico
- Died: 1916 (aged 61–62)
- Occupation: Poet, essayist
- Education: Escuela Normal para Señoritas

Mercedes Eustolia Brigida María de la Trinidad Carrasco Herrera (9 November 1854 – 1916) was a Mexican poet and writer. She participated in various cultural and poetic movements and wrote many pedagogical essays which were published in the newspaper La Ley. Between 1894 and 1896, she collaborated in the Boletín pedagógico del Estado de México ("Pedagogical Bulletin of the State of Mexico").

She expressed great interest in literary expression and the importance of teaching children proficiency in the language. As an example of this is the following paper published on December 15, 1894 with the title Ejercicios de recitación en las escuelas primarias ("Recitation exercises in primary schools"):

Spanish: En la enseñanza del idioma no debe omitirse nunca un género especial de ejercicios por lo que los alumnos adquieren o cultivan muy estimables dotes: una locución fácil expedita y clara; un timbre de voz sonoro y agradable; un porte y ademanes dignos, y sobre todo, un gran caudal de vocablos, giros nuevos para expresar sus ideas, enriqueciendo su lenguaje, ejercitando su memoria y a la vez cultivando su gusto artístico. English: In language teaching, a special kind of exercise should never be omitted, so that students acquire or cultivate very valuable skills: an easy, expeditious and clear speech; a loud and pleasant voice timbre; dignified demeanero and gestures, and above all, a great flow of words, new turns to express their ideas, enriching their language, exercising their memory and at the same time cultivating their artistic taste.
